Bolma jacquelineae is a species of sea snail, a marine gastropod mollusk in the family Turbinidae, the turban snails.

Description
The size of the adult shell varies between 22 mm and 30 mm.

Distribution
This species is found in the Atlantic Ocean off Sierra Leone, Angola and in the Western Mediterranean Sea.

References

 
 Marche–Marchad, I., 1957. Description de cinq gastropodes marins nouveaux de la côte occidentale d'Afrique. Bulletin du Muséum national d'Histoire naturelle 29(2): 200–205, 1 pl, sér. 2° série
 Nolf F. 2005. A new species of Bolma (Gastropoda: Turbinoidea: Turbinidae) from Angola. Neptunea 4 (5) : 1–7
 Nolf F. (2010) About the variability of Bolma jacquelinae (Marche–Marchad, 1957) (Mollusca: Gastropoda: Turbinidae). Neptunea 9(3): 1–11

External links
 

jacquelineae
Gastropods described in 1957